Jordi Puig Vicens (born April 16, 1971 in Girona, Catalonia, Spain) is a retired basketball player.

Clubs
1988-93: CB Girona

External links
 ACB profile
 

1971 births
Living people
Spanish men's basketball players
Basketball players from Catalonia
Liga ACB players
CB Girona players
Point guards
Sportspeople from Girona
20th-century Spanish people